Events from the year 1586 in Sweden.

Incumbents
 Monarch – John III

Events

 The Örebro kyrkomöte (Örebro Church Council) is held as a protest to the pro-Catholic church policy of the King.

Births

 Gabriel Bengtsson Oxenstierna, statesman and diplomat (died 1656)

Deaths
 Margareta Birgersdotter Grip, genealogist and writer (born 1538)

References

 
Years of the 16th century in Sweden
Sweden